NIST-F2 is a cesium fountain atomic clock that, along with NIST-F1, serves as the United States' primary time and frequency standard. NIST-F2 was brought online on 3 April 2014.

Accuracy

The planned performance of NIST-F2 is δf / f < . At this planned performance level the NIST-F2 clock will not lose a second in at least 300 million years.

Evaluated accuracy
The evaluated accuracy (uB) reports of various primary frequency and time standards are published online by the International Bureau of Weights and Measures (BIPM).

The last submission of NIST-F1 to BIPM TAI was February 2016.

At the request of the Italian standards organization, NIST manufactured many duplicate components for a second version of NIST-F2, known as IT-CsF2 to be operated by the Istituto Nazionale di Ricerca Metrologica (INRiM), NIST's counterpart in Turin, Italy.

References

External links 
 NIST Time and Frequency Div. — 2004: Strategic Focus 1 (National Institute of Standards and Technology)
 
 
National Institute of Standards and Technology
Atomic clocks